Tippy Larkin (November 11, 1917 – December 10, 1991), born Antonio Pilliteri, was an American boxer from New Jersey who took the world light-welterweight boxing championship on April 29, 1946 in a twelve-round unanimous decision against Willie Joyce in Boston.  From 1935 to 1946, Larkin's record was 114-9. He had Angelo Pucci as manager throughout his career, and during the nineteen bouts he had at Madison Square Garden.

Early life and career
Larkin was born on December 11, 1917 to a family of Italian heritage, in Garfield, New Jersey.  He took the name Tippy from the initials for his real name Antonio Pilliteri, or Tony Pilliteri. He got the name Larkin from his older brother Frank who had boxed as Bobby Larkin.

In 1934, at the age of seventeen, the young Larkin went off to work for a camp of the Civilian Conservation Corp (CCC) during America's great depression, and soon helped to start inter-camp boxing matches with his co-workers. According to the legend he scored nine straight knockouts in these first amateur bouts.

Between March 1935 and October 1936, he won twenty-nine straight fights, many by knockout. His winning record throughout his early career was remarkable.

By December 19, 1938, Larkin was rated sixth in the World among American Lightweights, with Henry Armstrong as Champion and Lou Ambers rated first.

Demonstrating he was not invincible, on March 8, 1940, Texan Lew Jenkins knocked him out in the first round at Madison Square Garden.  Jenkins was considered a knockout specialist. "Tearing out with the bell, the slugger from the Southwest (Jenkins) took command immediately. He threw both fists without a stop, finally connecting with a series of solid lefts and rights and Larkin dropped in his corner."

After an eight-month lay off to recover from an illness, Larkin stopped Joey Silva on March 13, 1941, in a fourth-round technical knockout in Jersey City, New Jersey.  The bout was stopped at 1:49 into the fourth round by the referee because of a cut near Silva's eye.

In the Spring of 1942, Larkin shot himself in the shoulder while cleaning his 22 rifle at home.  He fought only once between February and May of that year, but was not badly injured and resumed his boxing career with considerable success by June.

In a ramp up to the NYSAC Lightweight Championship, on October 26, 1942, Larkin knocked out Abe Denner in 2:53 of the second round at Laurel Garden in New Jersey. Denner had been down for a count of eight in the second round, before the knockout. Larkin weighed 137 for the bout, actually two pounds over the lightweight limit.

World Light title attempt
On December 18, 1942, he fought Beau Jack for the New York State Athletic Commission's World Lightweight Title, losing in a third-round knockout at Madison Square Garden. The bout was the first in an elimination tournament for the Lightweight Championship staged by the NYAC, after Sammy Angott had vacated the title.  Larkin was knocked out by a right from Jack near a neutral corner in one minute and nineteen seconds of the third round, but had gone down for a one count in the first round.  The fighting was fierce with many punches connecting, and few pauses from the constant punching by both opponents.  Both boxers weighed between 133-34, in the lightweight range.  A large crowd of 18,817 were on hand to see the bout at the Garden.

Loss to Henry Armstrong

On March 9, 1943, he lost to former triple World Champion Henry Armstrong in a second-round knockout before a crowd of 8,000 in Civic Auditorium in San Francisco.  Armstrong was attempting a comeback and had formerly held the record for the most consecutive defenses of the World Welterweight Title.  Though Armstrong was a strong draw in his native state, the Light Welterweight division was not. Armstrong knocked out Larkin in one minute and nine seconds of the second round.  Both boxers were weighed in at the light welterweight range of around 140 pounds. Losing to Armstrong was no disgrace, as the great champion Barney Ross discovered in his career ending bout with Armstrong in May 1938.

Important opponents, 1943–44
On November 15, 1943, Larkin gained a ten-round points decision over Rhode Island native Al Costa, in Providence, Rhode Island, giving "an almost perfect exhibition of boxing skill".  Costa was considered a competent welterweight. Larkin was already boxing at 142 pounds, well into the welterweight range.

On December 10, 1943, Larkin knocked out "Doll" Rafferty halfway through the second round of a scheduled ten round bout at the Mechanic's Building in Boston.  Larkin's weight was 136, near the top of the lightweight limit.  Rafferty was down twice, once for a count of nine, before the blow which put him on the canvas for the count of ten.

On January 14, 1944, Larkin fought a rough ten-round draw against Bobby Ruffin at Madision Square Garden.  A very substantial crowd of 15,323 watched the close bout at the Garden, and the bout gained a greater audience as it was one of the first widely televised boxing matches. Ruffin's manager, Maurie Waxman, was displeased with the Draw ruling.

Win over LuLu Constantino
On February 9, 1944, Larkin easily won a ten-round points decision against LuLu Constantino, considered an important opponent, at Madison Square Garden.  A crowd of 11,535 watched the bout. Tippy boxed at just under 140 pounds, and took a penalty for not being able to make 137.  Using his longer reach, he landed solidly, and rocked Constantino in the fourth, sixth, seventh, and eighth rounds.

Win over Allie Stoltz
On March 23, 1944, he defeated Allie Stolz, a well rated lightweight, at Madison Square Garden.  Stoltz had the better of the bout in the first two rounds, then overconfident and taunting in the third, he took two hard rights to the chin spaced apart, going down for both before the referee stopped the bout. Larkin was slightly over the lightweight limit at 137 pounds, and into light welterweight territory.  The bout was fought before 15,373 fans at the Garden, a sizable crowd. Larkin would have trouble staying within the lightweight and later junior welterweight limit in his career.

On June 2, 1944, Larkin achieved an eighth-round technical knockout over Freddie Archer at Madison Square Garden.  He stopped Archer with a very strong straight right arm and the fight eventually ended when the referee stopped the fight one minute and twenty four seconds into the eighth round.  Archer was briefly unconscious on the ropes after the blow, and was hospitalized overnight.<ref>"Tippy Larkin Stops Archer", "Belvidere Daily Republican, Belvidere, Illinois, pg. 3, 3 June 1944</ref>

Larkin appeared on the cover of The Ring'' magazine in July 1944, gaining recognition as an up-and-coming boxer who was a candidate for the Lightweight championship.

World Light Welter champ, 1945
Larkin first met Joyce on August 3, 1945, in a ten-round unanimous decision at Madison Square Garden. The bout was described by one source as "one of the best fights of his career". In front of a crowd of over 13,000, Larkin defeated Joyce, though he was a slight underdog in the betting. Larkin had taken an entire year off from boxing prior to the bout to work in a war plant. Both boxers took some serious blows in the bout, with Larkin's left eye blackened.

On March 22, 1946, Larkin outpointed Nick Moran in ten rounds, at Madison Square Garden. Larkin weighed just over 140 for the bout, again fighting as a welterweight.

In their second meeting, Larkin took the World Light-Welterweight championship on April 29, 1946 in a twelve-round Unanimous Decision over Willie Joyce in Boston. Larkin was ruled to have won ten of the twelve rounds in what was considered a small crowd of under 8,000 for the championship fight at the Garden. Though Joyce had Larkin down three times for eight counts in the third round, Larkin came back for the remaining nine rounds and won the bout in the end.

World Light Welter defenses
In a rematch with Joyce, Larkin successfully defended the Light-welterweight championship only once on September 13, 1946 in Madison Square Garden in a twelve-round Unanimous Decision. Sometime after the bout, most likely unable to consistently maintain the restrictive weight, Larkin vacated the Light Welterweight championship. The division was discontinued for several years after Larkin held it, until he was succeeded by Carlos Ortiz thirteen years later.

On February 14, 1947 Charlie Fusari knocked out Larkin in the ninth round at Madison Square Garden, putting him on the canvas a total of nine times in the rather one-sided fight.  A crowd of 18, 494 packed the Garden to see the bout. Larkin was down on the mat in the first, second, seventh, and eight rounds. On October 21, 1948, Larkin would lose again to Fusari at the Armory in New Jersey, in a sixth-round technical knockout.  Fusari was considered at one time a top contender for the World Welterweight Championship.

On March 21, 1947, Larkin defeated Billy Graham, a highly rated welterweight before a crowd of 14, 054 at Madison Square Garden. Larkin easily won a unanimous ten-round decision by the judges. In the first two rounds, Graham forced the fighting landing squarely in the first, and leaving a considerable gash on Larkin's nose in the second that later required stitches.  From the third round on, Larkin effectively counterpunched Graham and gain a lead on points in every successive round.  Graham only threatened in the seventh with a left hook to the chin that connected, but from which Larkin recovered. The judges gave Graham no more than two rounds in the bout.

On June 20, 1947, Larkin was knocked out by Ike Williams, NBA Lightweight Champion, in the fourth round of a non-title fight at Madison Square Garden. Larkin had been down once in the important bout for a count of nine in the fourth, before resuming the fight, and later being down and counted out later in the round.

Larkin's last fight would be loss by fourth-round technical knockout on December 29, 1952 against Steve Marcello, in Providence, Rhode Island. Larkin's manager immediately announced he would retire after the bout.

Reckless driving in 1957
On September 18, 1957, Larkin was arrested for drunken driving, and driving without a license or registration in New York.

On October 25, 1957, Larkin suffered a broken left leg and several broken ribs in a head on car accident which was later determined to have been his fault. Larkin was driving South in the Northbound lane. In early 1958 as a result of the October accident, he was sentenced to one to three years and jailed for causing death by reckless driving. His attorney claimed he was also a victim in the automobile crash that caused the unfortunate death of the New Jersey driver whose car he struck, but could not prevent Larkin's sentence.

Death
Larkin retired from boxing in 1952.

He died on December 10, 1991 in Passaic, New Jersey of kidney failure.  He was buried on December 14 in Clifton, New Jersey.

Larkin was inducted into the World Boxing Hall of Fame in 1992.

Professional boxing record
All information in this section is derived from BoxRec, unless otherwise stated.

Official record

All newspaper decisions are officially regarded as “no decision” bouts and are not counted in the win/loss/draw column.

Unofficial record

Record with the inclusion of newspaper decisions in the win/loss/draw column.

See also
List of light welterweight boxing champions

References

External links

 http://www.boxrec.com/media/index.php?title=Human:9619
Tippy Larkin - CBZ Profile

1917 births
1991 deaths
Boxers from New Jersey
People from Garfield, New Jersey
Sportspeople from Bergen County, New Jersey
World boxing champions
Lightweight boxers
Light-welterweight boxers
Welterweight boxers
American male boxers